"The Fireman" is a song written by Mack Vickery and Wayne Kemp, and recorded by American country music artist George Strait.  It was released in May 1985 as the third and final single from his album Does Fort Worth Ever Cross Your Mind.  It reached number 5 on the country music chart in the United States, and number 10 in Canada.

Content
The narrator is a man with charm and wit that can cool down any angry woman. He tends to go after women that have just been in fights with their significant other or have recently experienced a break up. He even heads over to his friend's place to "cool off" the friend's woman with "a little mouth to mouth."

Critical reception
Kevin John Coyne of Country Universe gave the song a B− grade," calling it "more cocky than clever" and that "the strained metaphor that gives structure to the song errs too far on the side of ridiculous." He goes on to say that the only reason the song is "listenable at all is the fantastic Western swing arrangement and Strait’s in-on-the-joke delivery."

Chart positions

Certifications

References

1985 singles
George Strait songs
Songs written by Wayne Kemp
Songs written by Mack Vickery
Song recordings produced by Jimmy Bowen
MCA Records singles
1984 songs